Canterbury is an unincorporated community in Mingo County, West Virginia, United States. Its post office  is closed.

The community was named for the English city of Canterbury. However, another source asserts the community was probably named after the local Canterbury family.

References

Unincorporated communities in West Virginia
Unincorporated communities in Mingo County, West Virginia